Timocratica melanostriga is a moth in the family Depressariidae. It was described by Vitor O. Becker in 1982. It is found in Santa Catarina, Brazil.

References

Moths described in 1982
Taxa named by Vitor Becker
Timocratica